Esava Ratugolea (born 24 July 1998) is a professional Australian rules footballer playing for the Geelong Football Club in the Australian Football League (AFL). Ratugolea was drafted by Geelong with their third pick and forty-third overall in the 2016 national draft. Ratugolea made his debut in Geelong's 3-point win against  in round 1, 2018 at the Melbourne Cricket Ground.

Ratugolea was born in Griffith, New South Wales. His parents are Fijian, and arrived in Australia a few years before his birth. At the age of six, Ratugolea moved to Cobram, Victoria. He only began playing football in 2011, after previously playing rugby and soccer.

Statistics
Updated to the end of the 2022 season.

|-
| 2018 ||  || 17
| 8 || 7 || 7 || 37 || 32 || 69 || 26 || 15 || 62 || 0.9 || 0.9 || 4.6 || 4.0 || 8.6 || 3.3 || 1.9 || 7.8
|- 
| 2019 ||  || 17
| 20 || 15 || 15 || 103 || 72 || 175 || 53 || 46 || 126 || 0.8 || 0.8 || 5.2 || 3.6 || 8.8 || 2.7 || 2.3 || 6.3
|-
| 2020 ||  || 17
| 12 || 5 || 5 || 60 || 44 || 104 || 32 || 30 || 73 || 0.4 || 0.4 || 5.0 || 3.7 || 8.7 || 2.7 || 2.5 || 6.1
|- 
| 2021 ||  || 17
| 15 || 11 || 5 || 63 || 52 || 115 || 32 || 30 || 93 || 0.7 || 0.3 || 4.2 || 3.5 || 7.7 || 2.1 || 2.0 || 6.2
|- 
| 2022 ||  || 17
| 4 || 0 || 0 || 17 || 9 || 26 || 9 || 8 || 13 || 0.0 || 0.0 || 4.3 || 2.3 || 6.5 || 2.3 || 2.0 || 3.3
|- class=sortbottom
! colspan=3 | Career
! 59 !! 38 !! 32 !! 280 !! 209 !! 489 !! 152 !! 129 !! 367 !! 0.6 !! 0.5 !! 4.7 !! 3.5 !! 8.3 !! 2.6 !! 2.2 !! 6.2
|}

Notes

Honours and achievements
Team
 2× McClelland Trophy: 2019, 2022

Individual
 Geelong F.C. Community Champion Award: 2021

References

External links

Living people
1998 births
Geelong Football Club players
Murray Bushrangers players
Australian rules footballers from Victoria (Australia)
Australian people of I-Taukei Fijian descent